The tympanic plexus is a nerve plexus within the tympanic cavity formed upon the promontory of tympanic cavity by the tympanic nerve (branch of the inferior ganglion of glossopharyngeal nerve (CN IX)), and the superior and inferior caroticotympanic nerves (post-ganglionic sympathetic branches of the carotid plexus).

The lesser petrosal nerve (which may be considered a continuation of the tympanic nerve) traverses the tympanic plexus.

Anatomy

Distribution 
The tympanic plexus innervates the mucosa of the tympanic cavity, pharyngotympanic tube, and mastoid air cell. It issues a branch to the greater petrosal nerve (through an opening anterior to the oval window).

References

External links
 
 

Nerve plexus
Glossopharyngeal nerve